is a Japanese immunologist known for his pioneer research on Interferons and Interferon regulatory factors.

Contribution 
Taniguchi's work is mostly focused on immunity and oncogenesis, in particular on the mechanisms of signal transduction and gene expression. While working at the Cancer Institute in Tokyo, he conducted breakthrough research on sequencing the cDNA, and identified two cytokine genes, interferon-beta and interleukin-2. These advances helped characterize various cytokines and discover a new family of transcription factors, interferon regulatory factors, which play essential roles in the immune system and cancer.

Biography 
After graduating in biology from the Tokyo University of Education in 1971, Taniguchi worked at the Laboratory of Biochemistry, University of Naples, Italy from 1972 to 1974. He then went to the University of Zurich, where in 1978 he received his doctorate in molecular biology under the supervision of Charles Weissmann. The same year he started working at the Cancer Institute, Japanese Foundation for Cancer Research. Then for two years he was a visiting associate professor at New York University, and in 1984 was appointed as professor of molecular and cell biology at Osaka University. From 1995 to 2012, he was a professor at the Faculty of Medicine, the University of Tokyo. Since 2012, he has been a professor at the Institute of Industrial Science, the University of Tokyo. He is also an adjunct professor at the New York University School of Medicine.

Honors and awards 
Taniguchi received numerous awards, including the Milstein Award, Asahi Prize (1989), Robert Koch Prize (1991), Keio Medical Science Prize (1997), Japan Academy Prize (2000), Pezcoller-AACR International Award for Cancer Research (2006) and Tomizo Yoshida Award of the Japanese Cancer Association (2008).

He was selected as a Person of Cultural Merit by the Government of Japan and as an honorary doctor by the University of Zurich (2007). He is a member of the National Academy of Sciences, USA (since 2003) and an honorary citizen of Aridagawa, Wakayama (since 2010).

Editorial activities 
He is an editor of the journals Proceedings of the National Academy of Sciences, eLife and Immunity.

See also 
List of members of the National Academy of Sciences (Immunology)

References

External links 

Taniguchi Lab, University of Tokyo

1948 births
Living people
Japanese immunologists
Japanese molecular biologists
Cancer researchers
Academic staff of the University of Tokyo
University of Zurich alumni
Foreign associates of the National Academy of Sciences
Members of the National Academy of Medicine